Angie Ward (born June 12, 1968) is a CMA award-winning media personality and Class of 2021 inductee into the Country Radio Hall Of Fame. She is the Assistant Program Director at IHeartMedia radio station WUBL, known as 94.9 The Bull in Atlanta, GA. She can be heard daily on WUBL (Atlanta), WKKT (Charlotte),WPGB (Pittsburgh), KVET (Austin), WNCB (Raleigh), and WTQR (Greensboro). She has more than 25 years of experience both on and off the air in radio broadcasting & television and can also be heard weekly on 60 other Country radio stations across the United States, and streamed on desktop or mobile devices via the iHeartRadio Country channel.

Early life
Angie Ward born La Jolla, California. She graduated from Colonial Hills Christian School in 1986, Jefferson State College in 1990, and Auburn University in 1992.

Ward grew up on a horse farm in Alpharetta, GA. Her parents Marvin and Audrey, and sister Amanda own and operate Ward Stables located north of Atlanta, one of the top American Saddlebred Training facilities in the Southeastern United States. Father Marvin Ward is a member of the American Saddlebred Horse Association of Georgia's Hall of Fame

Career
Angie started her radio career while she was in college, with her first job in radio as a sportscaster at Auburn University. Later, she became the music director at Clear Channel Radio and program director for WNEU and WSTH. She can be heard across 65 country stations including iHeartRadio.

Awards

Philanthropy
Angie Ward is very active in the non-profit community, volunteering or helping to raise money for many national and local charities.

Ward formed her own team called ''Angie Ward's Q Boob Crew" to participate in the annual Susan G Komen Race for the Cure held annually in Winston-Salem, North Carolina. Over the years the team raised thousands of dollars to fight Breast cancer in memory of her late friend & cancer victim Liz.

For over 25 years Ward has participated in radiothons and events for St. Jude Children's Research Hospital in Memphis Tennessee that have raised in excess of 10 Million dollars.

During her years in Atlanta she has continued to make improving children's lives her focus as a champion for the Pediatric Brain Tumor Foundation, CURE Childhood Cancer, and Children's Healthcare of Atlanta.

Ward was an early supporter, contributor and volunteer at the Victory Junction Gang Camp located in Randleman, North Carolina. The camp was started by her friend NASCAR driver Kyle Petty & his wife Patty following the death of their son Adam Petty in an accident in 2000. It serves terminally-ill children.

She is also involved with March of Dimes, the Make-A-Wish Foundation, the American Red Cross, Second Harvest Food Bank, and Ronald McDonald House.

Personal life
Ward married husband Tim Satterfield on October 27, 2001, at the Viva Las Vegas Wedding Chapel in Las Vegas, Nevada. She has one Daughter: Cierra Noelle born on December 25, 1989. Daughter Cierra married Nicholas Carter Davant in Wilmington, North Carolina on June 5, 2007. She has one Grandson: Rydan Carter Davant born in Greensboro, North Carolina on September 2, 2007. She has one Granddaughter: Emery Monroe Davant born in Cumming, Georgia on February 8, 2015.

See also
 WUBL
 KVET
 WTQR
 WESC-FM
 iHeartRadio

References

External links
 Angie Ward on WUBL
 Angie Ward on KVET
 Country Music Association CMA
 iHeartRadio
 Ward Stables

1968 births
Living people
American radio personalities
People from La Jolla, San Diego
Auburn University alumni